Giovanni Minzoni (born 1 July 1885 in Ravenna; died on 23 August 1923 in Argenta, province of Ferrara) was an Italian anti-fascist Catholic priest who was killed by a fascist squad in 1923.

Minzoni was born to a middle-class family. He studied in a seminary and in 1909 was ordained priest. The following year he was appointed deputy pastor in the town of Argenta (in Emilia-Romagna), which he left in 1912 to go to study in the Scuola Sociale in Bergamo, where he was awarded his degree.

World War I 
Called up by the army of the Kingdom of Italy in August 1916, he asked to serve as a military chaplain among the young soldiers at the Italian north-eastern front, and during a very critical moment in the Battle of the Piave River, he showed great courage, for which he was awarded the Silver Medal of Military Valor.

Antifascism and the scout movement 
At the end of World War I, Minzoni returned to Argenta, where he joined the Popular Party (Partito Popolare Italiano), the fore-runner of the Christian Democrats. Although this was a rather centrist party, he became friends with the socialist labor union leader Natale Gaiba, who was assassinated by the blackshirts in 1923. This and many other episodes turned him against fascism. In addition to his ideas about social rights, he became increasingly convinced of the need for cooperation, thus becoming an open enemy of the fascist regime that strongly favored corporativism.

Minzoni opposed the introduction of the fascist youth movement, the Opera Nazionale Balilla, in Argenta, because he believed the young people of the town should instead be educated in the values of Catholicism. After meeting Father Emilio Faggioli, who founded the scout group Bologna I in April 1917, and who became regional assistant for the Catholic Scouts in Emilia-Romagna, Minzoni became convinced of the virtues and good values taught by the Scout Movement. He therefore decided to found a scout group in his own parish.

In July 1923, Minzoni invited Faggioli to speak about the aims of the Scout Movement in the parish hall in Argenta. Local fascists vocally objected to the formation of a youth group not under the control of Mussolini and vowed that no scouts would enter the main square, to which Faggioli replied that the scouts would enter the main square as long as Minzoni was there. More than seventy scouts were subsequently enrolled.

Death 
Increasingly in conflict with the local Mussolinian establishment, Minzoni was killed around 10:30 pm on August 23, 1923 by two fascist "squadristi", Giorgio Molinari and Vittore Casoni, who smashed his skull with a club; they were reportedly following orders of the local Console di Milizia Italo Balbo, who was so shaken by the scandal that he had to resign from his post temporarily. All the accused were later acquitted at trial in 1925.

Just before his death, Minzoni wrote in his diary:

His death turned his prayer into reality, fulfilling a promise he made before departing for WWI:

Aftermath 
The Italian newspapers :it:Il Popolo and :it:La Voce Repubblicana, still partly free in 1923, covered the murder extensively, naming those directly responsible and their instigator, Italo Balbo. They were absolved at trial due to interference and pressure from the fascist squads and media.

A new trial was held after the end of World War II, when the fascists were no longer able to threaten and cover up the truth. The verdict absolved Balbo of charges, and condemned Giorgio Molinari and Vittore Casoni for second degree murder.

After the war, Giovanni Minzoni became a symbol of the Italian Catholic Resistance, and many books were written about the martyrdom of this lesser parish priest, widely known for his courage and sanctity. As of 2016, his martyrdom was still being commemorated by groups including Azione Cattolica and the Christian Associations of Italian Workers. Pope John Paul II wrote the following letter to the bishop of Ravenna on the 60th anniversary of Minzoni's death:

Bibliography

In Italian 
 Lorenzo Bedeschi, Diario di Don Minzoni, (1965).
 Nicola Palumbi, Don Giovanni Minzoni. Educatore e martire, Milan 2003.

See also 
 Censorship under fascist regimes
 Freedom of the press in the Kingdom of Italy

References

People from the Province of Ferrara
People murdered in Italy
Scouting and Guiding in Italy
1885 births
1923 deaths
Italian military chaplains
Royal Italian Army chaplains
World War I chaplains
Deaths by beating in Italy
Italian murder victims
20th-century Roman Catholic martyrs
People from Ravenna
Italian anti-fascists
Recipients of the Silver Medal of Military Valor
20th-century Italian Roman Catholic priests